Michael Duane Bliss (born April 5, 1965) is an American professional stock car racing driver. A journeyman NASCAR competitor and the 2002 NASCAR Craftsman Truck Series champion, he has run in all three national series.

Racing career
Bliss began racing at age 10. He captured his first major victory in 1993 with the USAC Silver Crown National Championship.

1995–1999

Bliss began racing in NASCAR in 1995, driving the Nos. 08 and 2 Ford F-150 for Ultra Motorsports in the new Craftsman Truck Series. Competing in 19 out of 20 races, Bliss picked up a win at North Wilkesboro Speedway and finished eighth in points. The next year, with sponsorship from Team ASE Racing, he won at Evergreen and I-70 and finished fifth in points.  In 1998, he made his debut in the upper-NASCAR ranks. First, he finished 26th at the Kenwood Home & Car Audio 300 driving a car owned by Kevin Schwantz, then two weeks later, finished seventh at Indianapolis Raceway Park for Michael Waltrip Racing. He also ran a pair of Winston Cup races that season, finishing 25th at Martinsville Speedway in the No. 96 for American Equipment Racing.

After winning six poles and finishing tenth in points in 1998, Bliss announced he would not return to the team after 1998, and signed with Roush Racing to drive the No. 99 Exide Batteries Ford. He picked up a win at Heartland Park Topeka and finished ninth in points. During the season, he began to pick up offers to run in the Cup Series, and left Roush. In 1999, Bliss ran two Winston Cup races for Bahari Racing with sponsorship from Sara Lee products.

2000–2004
In 2000, Bliss signed to drive the No. 14 Conseco-sponsored Pontiac Grand Prix owned by A.J. Foyt Racing in a bid for NASCAR Winston Cup Series Rookie of the Year honors. Because the team had no owner's points, Bliss failed to qualify for three out of the first four races of the season, and he was quickly released. He soon signed to drive the No. 27 Pfizer/Viagra-sponsored Pontiac for Eel River Racing. He had a ninth-place run at Talladega Superspeedway and finished 39th in points that year.

Bliss was unable to pick up a full-time ride for the 2001 season. He finished 40th at Daytona International Speedway in a one-race deal for David Ridling, but that team soon closed its doors. During the middle of the season, he briefly returned to Eel River after they fired their regular driver but he was unable to qualify for a race. Late in the season, he garnered a ninth-place run at South Boston in a one-race deal for IWX Racing's Steve Coulter.

In 2002, Coulter returned full-time to the Truck Series and signed Bliss as the driver. Bliss picked up five wins and won the Truck series championship. He would sign to drive the No. 20 Rockwell Automation-sponsored Chevrolet for Joe Gibbs Racing in the Busch Series the following year, posting 14 Top 10s and finishing 10th in points. That same year, he competed in the International Race of Champions, winning at Chicagoland Speedway. He ran only one Winston Cup race in 2002, subbing for Jamie McMurray (who was subbing for the injured Sterling Marlin, but had a prior commitment) in the No. 40 Coors Light-sponsored Dodge. In 2004, Bliss picked up his first career Busch win at Lowe's Motor Speedway and finished fifth in points. After he was declined a job as driver for Gibbs’ Cup program, Bliss announced his departure, and replaced Ward Burton at Haas CNC Racing’s Cup ride, posting a tenth place run at Darlington Raceway.

Before leaving Joe Gibbs Racing, Mike Bliss had his career-best finish to date in his Cup series career in the 2004 Chevy Rock & Roll 400. Bliss, driving the No. 80 Hunt's Ketchup-sponsored JGR car, got penalized for speeding on pit road on lap 332. Despite this, he formed a tremendous comeback, climbing through the field during the final 50 laps, and finishing fourth, his first and only Top 5 to date.

2005–2009
Bliss signed with Haas CNC full-time in 2005, where he posted two Top 10's in the latter half of the season and finished 28th in points. He came near to a Cup victory, nearly winning a large bonus paycheck and a win in the Nextel Open event but was crashed by Brian Vickers on the final lap in the final turn. Vickers won the race and the bonus paycheck, while Bliss slid across the finish line in second-place. Mike Bliss was visibly upset with Vickers in the post-race ceremonies saying "I just got plain dumped and I would not have wrecked him to win this race. Now he is in the big show (the All-Star Race) and I am not."

At the end of the year, Bliss departed to return to the No. 16 in the Truck Series, winning at Atlanta Motor Speedway and finishing eleventh in the final standings. In addition, he ran a part-time in the Busch Series this season, splitting time between Frank Cicci Racing with Jim Kelly and SKI Motorsports. Late in the season, Bliss began driving the No. 49 BAM Racing Dodge Nextel Cup Car, and finished out the 2006 season driving the car for BAM. Bliss was signed to drive the car in 2007, but after a long string of DNQs, he resigned from the organization midway through the season. He drove the first four races of the 2007 Craftsman Truck season for Key Motorsports and drove 13 more Truck races for Bobby Hamilton Racing in the No. 4 Dodge Ram. He also drove 22 races in the Busch Series for Fitz Motorsports in the No. 22 Dodge Charger with sponsorships from Supercuts and Family Dollar. He had signed to drive for Fitz full-time in 2008, but joined Phoenix Racing shortly after the season started. He matched his career-best fifth-place finish in points and also ran part-time schedules in Cup and Trucks.

Bliss scored his second career Nationwide win, taking advantage of his fuel mileage and getting a caution at the right time, at Lowes Motor Speedway, and NASCAR declared the race official after 170 of 200 laps due to rain. On August 2, 2009, Bliss was let go from Phoenix Racing but he was still raced the team in cup series. He spent the rest of the season splitting time with MSRP Motorsports, NEMCO Motorsports, and CJM Racing before returning to Phoenix for the season finale at Homestead. Despite parking early in multiple races, three late Top 5 runs pushed Bliss into fifth overall again. This was one spot better than when he was fired from the No. 1 car.

2010–present

On December 3, 2009, it was announced that Bliss would return to the Sprint Cup Series full-time driving for Tommy Baldwin Racing in the No. 36 Wave Energy Drink-sponsored Chevrolet Impala for the 2010 season. However, in April, Bliss parted ways with TBR after Phoenix, and returned to Phoenix Racing to drive the No. 09 beginning at Talladega.

He returned to full-time status in 2011 by joining Mark Smith's TriStar Motorsports in the Nationwide Series in the No. 19 Chevrolet. Despite being originally paired with old crew chief Dave Fuge, Fuge left the team to form a Nationwide Series team with Derrike Cope. After interim crew chief Wes Ward left the team, former TRG Motorsports crew chief Paul Clapprood took over, leading Bliss to a 12th-place points finish. For 2012, Bliss moved to the No. 44. When teammate Tayler Malsam was released from the 19 team in October, he drove it for the remainder of the year. He ended the season with one Top 10 at Daytona in July where he finished eighth, and also finished eighth in points.

While continuing to drive for TriStar in the Xfinity series through the 2014 season, he also drove part-time in the Sprint Cup Series for Smith's start and park Humphrey Smith Motorsports team. In September 2013, he drove Phoenix Racing's No. 51 Chevrolet in the Sprint Cup AdvoCare 500 at Atlanta Motor Speedway, which was James Finch's final start as a team owner. Bliss had scored Finch's last win during a Nationwide race at Charlotte in 2009.

Bliss served as standby driver for David Ragan in the No. 34 Front Row Motorsports Ford at the 2014 Pocono 400 with Ragan on paternity watch. Later in the season, Bliss joined BK Racing in the No. 93 Toyota for the Quaker State 400, finishing 41st.

Bliss was hired by Go FAS Racing to drive the No. 32 Sprint Cup car sharing it with Bobby Labonte and Boris Said in 2015, while being scheduled to continue driving full-time for TriStar in the Xfinity Series.

At the season opening Xfinity race at Daytona in 2015, Bliss was replaced by Scott Lagasse Jr. because Lagasse brought sponsorship. Bliss returned to the car and drove through the spring Talladega race before being permanently removed from the car because former teammate Eric McClure brought full sponsorship. Bliss' ride was replaced by the new No. 24 driven by McClure and the No. 19 was relegated to a start and park ride. Bliss moved to a mentoring role for TriStar drivers McClure, Blake Koch, Cale Conley, and David Starr. He also continued in his part-time Sprint Cup ride with Go FAS Racing, but was released from the team after the Quicken Loans 400 at Michigan International Speedway.  Late in the season, he returned to the track in TriStar's No. 14 after Conley was released due to sponsorship issues, parking the car in the last three races of the season.

In 2016, Bliss has made a handful of one-off starts across the Xfinity Series and the Truck Series for various teams including TriStar, Contreras Motorsports, and MB Motorsports. Since 2016, Mike Bliss has made no further starts in any of NASCAR's Top 3 series. He most recently served as a driving coach for Joe Graf Jr when he drove for Chad Bryant Racing in the ARCA Menards Series East in 2019.

Motorsports career results

NASCAR
(key) (Bold – Pole position awarded by qualifying time. Italics – Pole position earned by points standings or practice time. * – Most laps led.)

Sprint Cup Series

Daytona 500

Xfinity Series

Camping World Truck Series

 Season still in progress
 Ineligible for series points

International Race of Champions
(key) (Bold – Pole position. * – Most laps led.)

Images

References

External links

 
 

Living people
1965 births
Sportspeople from Milwaukie, Oregon
Racing drivers from Oregon
Racing drivers from Portland, Oregon
NASCAR drivers
NASCAR Truck Series champions
International Race of Champions drivers
Joe Gibbs Racing drivers
Stewart-Haas Racing drivers
USAC Silver Crown Series drivers
Michael Waltrip Racing drivers
A. J. Foyt Enterprises drivers
Chip Ganassi Racing drivers
RFK Racing drivers